Saydun was a Palestinian village in the Ramle Subdistrict of Mandatory Palestine. It was depopulated during the 1947–48 Civil War in Mandatory Palestine on April 6, 1948, during Operation Nachshon. It was located 9 km south of Ramla on the east bank of Wadi Saydun.

History
In 1838,  it was noted as a large village  whose inhabitants were Muslim.

In 1863 Victor Guérin found it to have about 200 inhabitants, He further noted: "Sitting on a low hill, [] the houses are built of adobe. Lacking wood and coal, the Arabs of this locality, as well as many others in Palestine, make fire with sun-dried cow dung in the shape of rounded clods. They feed on water at a well of modern date, because the ancient well is dry." "This village [] must certainly succeed an ancient village".

An  Ottoman village list from about 1870 counted 35 houses and a population of 148, though  the population count included men, only.

In 1882, the PEF's Survey of Western Palestine described the place as: "a small village of the same class" (as  Shahma).

British Mandate era
In the 1922 census of Palestine conducted by the British Mandate authorities, Saidum had a population of 124 inhabitants, all  Muslims,  increasing in the 1931 census to 174, still all Muslims, in a total of 35 houses.

In the 1945 statistics  the village had a population of 210 Muslims with a total of 7,487  dunums of land. 49 dunums of land was used for plantations and irrigable land, 5,247 dunums were used for cereals,  while 15 dunams were classified as built-up public areas.

Post 1948
In 1992 the village site was described: "Cactuses and numerous  grapevines grow on the site. Only one stone house remains; it has a flat roof and a round-arched door and is used for storage. The surrounding land are used for agriculture by Israelis."

References

Bibliography

External links
Welcome To Saydun
Saydun,  Zochrot
Survey of Western Palestine, Map 16:   IAA, Wikimedia commons
Saydun, from the Khalil Sakakini Cultural Center

Arab villages depopulated during the 1948 Arab–Israeli War
District of Ramla